Simon Bracke (born 17 November 1995) is a Belgian footballer who currently plays for Tienen in the Belgian National Division 1.

Bracke made his debut for OH Leuven during the Belgian Second Division play-offs in 2014 against Eupen, a match which did not matter much as OH Leuven was already sure of relegation before the match. Bracke played 17 matches during the 2014–15 season, scoring once in the 3-0 home win against Racing Mechelen. OH Leuven promoted back in the Belgian Pro League at the end of that season and Bracke was deemed surplus and was therefore loaned for one season to ASV Geel where he played 25 matches, scoring three times. Bracke returned to OH Leuven for the 2016–17 season but was used infrequently and finally left after that season to play for Hasselt.

External links

1995 births
Living people
Belgian footballers
Association football midfielders
Oud-Heverlee Leuven players
A.S. Verbroedering Geel players
Sporting Hasselt players
K.V.K. Tienen-Hageland players
Challenger Pro League players